Events during the year 1999 in Northern Ireland.

Incumbents
 First Minister - David Trimble
 deputy First Minister - Seamus Mallon
 Secretary of State - Mo Mowlam (until 11 October), Peter Mandelson (from 11 October)

Events
15 March - Rosemary Nelson, a Lurgan solicitor, is killed in a car bomb attack by loyalist paramilitary group the Red Hand Defenders.
April - Senator George Mitchell Peace Bridge opened across the Border.
14 May - The fully renovated St George's Market in Belfast reopens its doors.
21 October - Peter Mandelson arrives in Belfast as the new Secretary of State for Northern Ireland.
29 November - Ten designated ministers are appointed to the power-sharing executive of the Northern Ireland Assembly.
2 December - The Irish Government ratifies changes to Articles 2 and 3 of the Constitution. Direct rule from Westminster in Northern Ireland ends.
13 December - The first meeting of the North/South Ministerial Council takes place in Armagh.
Nuala O'Loan is appointed as first Police Ombudsman for Northern Ireland.

Arts and literature
Ciaran Carson publishes The Ballad of HMS Belfast: A Compendium of Belfast Poems.
Seamus Heaney publishes a verse translation of Beowulf from the Old English.
Glenn Patterson publishes his novel The International.

Sport

Athletics
The 27th IAAF World Cross Country Championships were held 27–28 March in Belfast.

Football

Ulster Senior Football Championship
Winners: Armagh

Ulster Senior Club Football Championship
Winners: Crossmaglen Rangers

Irish League
Winners: Glentoran

Irish Cup
Winners: Portadown (as Cliftonville were disqualified)

Golf
The Amateur Championship is held at Royal County Down Golf Club, (winner:Graeme Storm).

Births
29 May - Feargal Mellon, Plumber

Deaths

January to June
11 January - Brian Moore, novelist (b.1921).
15 January - Robert Lowry, Baron Lowry, Lord Chief Justice of Northern Ireland (b.1919).
28 January - Markey Robinson, artist (b.1918).
15 March - Rosemary Nelson, solicitor killed by loyalist paramilitary group.
4 April - Sir James Flanagan, first and only Roman Catholic Chief Constable of the Royal Ulster Constabulary. (b.1914).
3 May - Paddy Kennedy, Republican Labour Party Councillor and MP (b.1942).
6 June - Billy Brown, musician and artist (b.1943).
29 June - Declan Mulholland, actor (b.1932).

July to December
1 July - William Whitelaw, 1st Viscount Whitelaw, first Secretary of State for Northern Ireland.
15 August - Paddy Devlin, a founder of the SDLP, a member of the 1974 Power Sharing Executive and author (b.1925).
21 August - Noel Larmour, cricketer and diplomat (b.1916).
23 August - James White, science fiction novelist (b.1928).
15 October - Josef Locke, tenor (b.1917).

Full date unknown
Eamon Collins, Provisional Irish Republican Army activist and writer (b.1954).

See also
1999 in England
1999 in Scotland
1999 in Wales

References

 
Northern Ireland